The year 1944 in science and technology involved some significant events, listed below.

Astronomy
 Hendrik van de Hulst predicts the 21 cm hyperfine line of neutral interstellar hydrogen.

Biology
 February 1 – Oswald T. Avery and colleagues publish the Avery–MacLeod–McCarty experiment showing that a DNA molecule can carry an inheritable trait to a living organism. This is important because many biologists thought that proteins were the hereditary material and nucleic acids too simple chemically to serve as genetic storage molecules.
 The lipopolysaccharide character of enteric endotoxins is elucidated by M. J. Shear.
 Erwin Schrödinger publishes What is Life?, containing conceptual discussion of the genetic code and of negentropy.
 Donald Griffin with G. W. Pierce demonstrate that bats use high-frequency sound in a technique which Griffin describes as echolocation.
 Last known evidence for existence of the Asiatic lion in the wild in Iran (Khuzestan Province).

Chemistry
 February – Lars Onsager publishes the exact solution to the two-dimensional Ising model.
 Americium discovered by Glenn T. Seaborg, et al.

Computer science
 August 7 – IBM dedicates the first program-controlled calculator, the Automatic Sequence Controlled Calculator, best known as the Harvard Mark I.

Geology
 March 18 – Last eruption of Mount Vesuvius.

History of science
 November 4 – The Whipple Museum of the History of Science is established when Robert Whipple presents his collection of scientific instruments to the University of Cambridge, England.
 C. Doris Hellman publishes her Columbia University thesis The Comet of 1577: Its Place in the History of Astronomy.

Mathematics
 John von Neumann and Oskar Morgenstern's book Theory of Games and Economic Behavior is published by Princeton University Press.

Medicine
 November 19 – Minnesota Starvation Experiment begins.
 Hans Asperger describes Asperger syndrome.
 David S. Sheridan invents the disposable plastic tracheal tube catheter.
 Dorothea and Alexander Leighton's book Navajo at the Door is "the earliest example of applied medical anthropology".

Meteorology
 June 5 – Group Captain James Stagg correctly forecasts a brief improvement in weather conditions over the English Channel which permits the following day's Normandy landings to take place.
 August 6 – Ball lightning observed in Uppsala, Sweden.

Physics
 November 6 – Hanford Site in Washington (state) produces its first plutonium.

Technology
 March 27 – In Sweden, Ruben Rausing patents Erik Wallenberg's method of packaging milk in paper, origin of the company Tetra Pak.
 June 13 – First operational use of the German V-1 flying bomb, the first operational cruise missile, containing a gyroscope guidance system and propelled by a simple pulsejet engine.
 September 8 – First operational use of the German V-2 rocket, the first ballistic missile. On June 20 one has become the first man-made object to cross the Kármán line and reach the edge of space.
 December 9 – First flight of the Heinkel He 162 Volksjäger, the second jet engined fighter aircraft to be introduced by the Luftwaffe in World War II.
 First operational use of a snorkel on a submarine.

Awards
 Nobel Prizes
 Physics – Isidor Isaac Rabi
 Chemistry – Otto Hahn
 Medicine – Joseph Erlanger, Herbert Spencer Gasser

Births
 February 8 – Howard Dalton (died 2008), English microbiologist.
 February 15 – Sigurd Hofmann, German physicist.
 March 7 – Michael Rosbash, American geneticist and chronobiologist, recipient of the Nobel Prize in Physiology or Medicine.
 June 1 – Colin Blakemore, English neurobiologist (died 2022).
 June 5 – Whitfield Diffie, American cryptographer.
 June 6 – Phillip Allen Sharp, American geneticist and molecular biologist, recipient of the Nobel Prize in Physiology or Medicine.
 June 22 – Gérard Mourou, French electrical engineer, recipient of the Nobel Prize in Physics.
 July 13 – Ernő Rubik, Hungarian inventor and architect.
 August 24 – Gregory Jarvis (died 1986), American astronaut.
 October 11 – William T. Greenough (died 2013), American neuroscientist. 
 October 16 – Elizabeth Loftus, American psychologist.
 October 21 – Jean-Pierre Sauvage, French coordination chemist, recipient of the Nobel Prize in Chemistry.
 December 19 – Richard Leakey (died 2022), Kenyan palaeoanthropologist.
 December 28 – Kary Mullis (died 2019), American biochemist, recipient of the Nobel Prize in Chemistry.

Deaths
 January 19 – Emily Winifred Dickson (born 1866), British gynaecologist.
 January 20 – James McKeen Cattell (born 1860), American psychologist.
 February 8 – Bernard Sachs (born 1858), American neurologist.
 March – John R.F. Jeffreys (born 1918), British mathematician and cryptanalysist.
 March 2 – Ida Maclean (born 1877), English biochemist.
 March 5 – Ernst Cohen (born 1869), Dutch Jewish chemist (in Auschwitz concentration camp).
 March 29 – Grace Chisholm Young (born 1868), English mathematician.
 August 23 – Margarete Zuelzer (born 1877), German Jewish microbiologist (in Westerbork transit camp).
 June 18 – Harry Fielding Reid (born 1859), American geophysicist.
 July 25 – Jakob Johann von Uexküll (born 1864), Baltic German pioneer of biosemiotics.
 November 2 – Thomas Midgley, Jr. (born 1889), American chemist and inventor.
 November 22 – Sir Arthur Eddington (born 1882), English astrophysicist.

References

 
20th century in science
1940s in science